Equestrian statue of Joan of Arc may refer to:
Equestrian statue of Joan of Arc (New York City), by Anna Hyatt Huntington, 1915
Equestrian statue of Joan of Arc (Paris), by Paul Dubois, 1889
Equestrian statue of Joan of Arc (Portland, Oregon), a 1925 copy
Equestrian statue of Joan of Arc (Washington, D.C.), a 1922 copy